The 2007 Western Michigan Broncos football team represented Western Michigan University in the 2007 NCAA Division I FBS football season.  The team was coached by Bill Cubit and played their homes game in Waldo Stadium in Kalamazoo, Michigan.  The Broncos finished the season 5–7 overall and 3–4 in the Mid-American Conference.  The highlight of the season was the 28–19 road victory over the Iowa Hawkeyes, a team that finished fifth in the Big Ten Conference
.

Preseason
The 2007 Bronco team returned 17 starters from an 8–5 team that finished 6–2 in the Mid-American Conference and participated in the 2007 International Bowl.  While the team lost the bowl game 27–24, Western Michigan was picked to finish first in the MAC West Division and to win the MAC Championship Game by the MAC News Media Association.

Watch lists
 Robbie Krutilla, C, Outland Trophy
 Jim Laney, P, Ray Guy Award
 Branden Ledbetter, TE, John Mackey Award

All-MAC preseason teams
 First team
 London Fryar, CB
 Robbie Krutilla, C
 Jamarko Simmons, WR
 Second team
 Louis Delmas, FS
 Branden Ledbetter, TE
 Brandon West, RB

Schedule

Roster

Coaching staff
 Bill Cubit (Head coach)
 Bill Miller - Defensive coordinator
 Tim Daoust - Defensive secondary
 Grant Heard - Wide receivers
 Scott Kavanagh - Quarterbacks
 Peter McCarthy - Defensive line
 Jake Moreland - Tight ends
 Steve Morrison - Linebackers, recruiting coordinator
 Bob Stanley - Offensive line
 Chris Tabor - Running backs, special teams
 Tim Knox - Director of Football Operations
 Matt Ludeman - Defensive Graduate Assistant
 A. J. Ricker - Offensive Graduate Assistant

Game summaries

West Virginia

Jamarko Simmons' 144 receiving yards on 14 catches with two touchdowns were not enough for Western Michigan to upset the #3 West Virginia Mountaineers.  West Virginia nearly doubled WMU's offensive production (542 yards to 277 yards) and cruised to a 62–24 victory behind two passing touchdowns by Pat White and four touchdowns (three rushing) by Steve Slaton.

Recap | Boxscore | WMU pregame notes

Indiana

WMU is 0–3 all-time vs Indiana.  The most recent meeting was in 2006 when the Hoosiers won 39–20.  All three games have been in Bloomington, Indiana.

Recap | Boxscore | WMU pregame notes

Missouri

In 1999, Missouri beat the Broncos 48–34.  That was the only meeting between the two schools.

Recap | Boxscore | WMU pregame notes

Central Connecticut State

 is the only Division I Football Championship Subdivision team on WMU's schedule.  This is the first ever meeting between the two schools.

Recap | Boxscore | WMU pregame notes

Toledo

This game is the Mid-American Conference conference opener for WMU.  Western Michigan defeated Toledo 31–10 in 2006 for the first time since 2000.  WMU has not won at the Glass Bowl since 1988 (31–9 victory).  Toledo leads the all-time series 36–25.

Recap | Boxscore | WMU pregame notes

Akron

After shutting out Akron last season 17–0, WMU leads the all-time series 11–3 (8–1 at Waldo Stadium).

Recap | Boxscore | WMU pregame notes

Northern Illinois

WMU leads the all-time series against Northern Illinois 20–11, including a 16–14 victory in 2006.

Recap | Boxscore | WMU pregame notes

Ball State

After losing to WMU 41–27 last season, Ball State went on to finish the season 3–1, with the lone loss being 34–26 against then-#2 ranked University of Michigan.  WMU leads the all-time series 19–14.  This game is WMU's Homecoming.

Recap | Boxscore | WMU pregame notes

Eastern Michigan

This game is the first of the 3 games that will determine the 2007 Michigan MAC Trophy winner (Central Michigan vs. WMU November 17 and CMU vs. Eastern Michigan November 17).  Western leads the all-time series 26-14-2 and has not lost in Rynearson Stadium since 1991 (7 wins).

Recap | Boxscore | WMU pregame notes

Central Michigan

In a nationally televised Tuesday night game, WMU leads the all-time series against CMU 43-32-2 and has not lost at home to Central Michigan since 1993 (6 wins).

Recap | Boxscore | WMU pregame notes

Iowa

The final non-conference game of the season is the first between WMU and Iowa since WMU won 27–21 in 2000.  That was the only meeting between the two schools.

Recap | Boxscore | WMU pregame notes

Temple

WMU defeated Temple 41–7 last season in a year when Temple finished the season 1–11.  WMU has never lost against Temple and leads the series 5–0.

Recap | Boxscore | WMU pregame notes

Awards

Mid-American Conference Player of the Week
 Offense
 Mark Bonds, RB, week 5 (26 car, 143 yds, 2 TD, 1 rec vs. Toledo)
 Tim Hiller, QB, week 12 (26–45, 367 yds, 3 TD, 0 INT vs. Iowa)
 Jamarko Simmons, WR, week 1 (14 rec, 144 yds, 2 TD vs. West Virginia)
 Defense
 Dustin Duclo, LB, week 7 (10 tackles, 2 fumble recoveries vs. Northern Illinois)
 Austin Pritchard, LB, week 1 (11 tackles vs. West Virginia)
 Special Teams
 Mike Jones, PK, week 7 (21 yard field goal, 2 punts inside 20-yard line vs. Northern Illinois)
 Jim Laney, P (2), week 1 (50.7 avg, 3 inside 20 vs. West Virginia), week 13 (40.2 avg, 2 inside 20, long punt of 57 yds vs. Temple)
 Brandon West, KR, RB (3), week 2 (5 ret, 212 yds, 42.4 avg, TD vs. Indiana), week 6 (5 ret, 120 yds, 24.0 avg vs. Akron), week 12 (30 car, 116 yds, 9 rec, 93 yds, 4 ret, 82 yds vs. Iowa)

Mid-American Conference Scholar-Athlete of the Week
 Tim Hiller, QB (3), week 2, week 6, week 12

Academic All-District
 Anthony Gebhart, S, First Team ESPN The Magazine Academic All-District IV

John Mackey Tight End of the Week
 Branden Ledbetter, TE, week 11 (5 rec, 124 yds, TD vs. Central Michigan)

Statistics

Team

Offense

Rushing

Passing

Receiving

Defense

Tackles

Interceptions

See also
 2007–08 Mid-American Conference season

References

External links
 2007 WMU Football Media Guide

Western Michigan
Western Michigan Broncos football seasons
Western Michigan Broncos football